The Dale class consisted of three tankers chartered for service for the Royal Fleet Auxiliary in 1967. They served for a number of years supporting Royal Navy and allied fleet operations, during which one, was lost. The remaining two were returned to their original owners in the mid-1970s.

Overview
Three large modern tankers, built to varying designs in the mid-1960s, were charted by the Royal Fleet Auxiliary to support naval operations east of the Suez Canal, in the waters of the Indian Ocean and the Far East. They were given traditional RFA names, reusing three names that had been used for the Second World War-era s. They were not fitted with equipment to allow them to replenish ships at sea, and were classified instead as 'Mobile Reserve Tankers'.

The smallest, RFA Ennerdale was also the shortest lived. She hit a coral reef and sank off Port Victoria on 1 June 1970. The wreck was subsequently destroyed with explosives fired from Wessex helicopters to prevent an oil spillage from threatening the Seychelles.  was returned to her original owners in 1974, but  remained in service until 1977. During this time Dewdale saw service with the Aden task force during the British withdrawal in 1967, and was then active then on the Beira Patrols. She was the last to leave service with the RFA, being returned in 1977 and commencing service under her old name of Edenfield.

Ships

Notes

References

Auxiliary replenishment ship classes
 Dale class tanker